Arctic Co-operatives Limited is a cooperative federation owned and controlled by 32 community-based cooperative business enterprises located in Nunavut, Northwest Territories, Yukon and northern Manitoba, Canada. Arctic Co-ops coordinates resources, consolidates the purchasing power and provides operational and technical support to the community-based co-operatives to enable them to provide a wide range of services to their local member-owners. Arctic Co-ops operates in both English and Inuktitut and provides patronage dividends to the local members.

Arctic Co-ops is a member of the Manitoba Cooperative Association.

Arctic Co-ops mission

Services
Arctic Co-ops provides services to each of the 32 member co-operatives. Services include: business services, retail services, petroleum support services, Canadian Arctic Producers, Northern Images Stores, Inns North hotels.

Arctic Co-ops member-owners
Arctic Co-ops consists of 32 member cooperatives from Nunavut, Northwest Territories, and the Yukon. Arctic Co-ops member-owners include: 
 Fort Good Hope Co-op Ltd. (Fort Good Hope, NWT)
 Great Bear Co-op Assoc. Ltd. (Deline, NWT)
 Grise Fiord Inuit Co-op Ltd. (Grise Fiord, NU) (inactive member)
 Hall Beach Co-op Assoc. Ltd. (Hall Beach, NU)
 Holman Co-op Ltd. (Ulukhaktok, NWT)
 Igloolik Co-op Ltd. (Igloolik, NU)
 Ikahuk Co-op Assoc. Ltd. (Sachs Harbour, NWT)
 Ikaluktutiak Co-op Ltd. (Cambridge Bay, NU)
 Issatik Co-op Ltd. (Whale Cove, NU)
 Kapami Co-op Assoc. Ltd. (Colville Lake, NWT)
 Katudgevik Co-op Assoc. Ltd. (Coral Harbour, NU)
 Kimik Co-op Ltd. (Kimmirut, NU)
 Kissarvik Co-op Assoc. Ltd. (Rankin Inlet, NU)
 Koomiut Co-op Assoc. Ltd. (Kugaaruk, NU)
 Kugluktuk Co-op Ltd. (Kugluktuk, NU)
 Mitiq Co-op Assoc. Ltd. (Sanikiluaq, NU)
 Naujat Co-op Ltd. (Naujaat, NU)
 Padlei Co-op Assoc. Ltd. (Arviat, NU)
 Paleajook Eskimo Co-op Ltd. (Taloyoak, NU)
 Pangnirtung Inuit Co-op Ltd. (Pangnirtung, NU)
 Pitsiulak Co-op Assoc. Ltd. (Chesterfield Inlet, NU)
 Old Crow Retail Co-op Ltd. (Old Crow, YT)
 Qikiqtaq Co-op Assoc. Ltd. (Gjoa Haven, NU)
 Sanavik Co-op Assoc. Ltd. (Baker Lake, NU)
 Lutsel K'e Co-op Ltd. (Łutselk'e, NWT)
 Taqqut Co-op Ltd. (Arctic Bay, NU)
 Tetlit Service Co-op Ltd. (Fort McPherson, NWT)
 Toonoonik-Sahoonik Co-oLtd. (Pond Inlet, NU)
 Tudjaat Co-op Ltd. (Resolute, NU)
 Tulugak Co-op Society Ltd. (Qikiqtarjuaq, NU)
 West Baffin Eskimo Co-op Ltd. (Kinngait, NU)
 Yellowknife Direct Charge (Yellowknife, NWT)

Divisions

Inns North
Inns North is the hotel division of Arctic Co-ops. In total there are 20 hotels, 19 in Nunavut and 2 in the NWT, owned by the aboriginal people of Northern Canada. A program has been set up by Arctic Co-ops to assist with training in such areas as standards and staff training. The hotels are locally owned and operated by the community co-op.

Inns North Hotels are located in both Nunavut and Northwest Territories.

Nunavut hotels include:
Amaulik Motel, Sanikiluaq
Amundsen Hotel, Gjoa Haven
Auyuittuq Lodge, Pangnirtung
Hall Beach Hotel, Hall Beach
Igloolik Inn Hotel, Igloolik
Iglu Hotel Ltd., Baker Lake
Ikaluktutiak Hotel and Arctic Island Lodge, Cambridge Bay
Inukshuk Inns North, Kugaaruk
Issatik Hotel, Whale Cove
Kimik Hotel, Kimmirut
Naujat Inns North, Naujaat
Padlei Inns North, Arviat
Qausuittuq Inns North, Resolute
Sauniq Hotel, Pond Inlet
Siniktarvik Hotel and Conference Centre, Rankin Inlet
Tangmavik Inns North, Chesterfield Inlet
Tulagak Inns North, Qikiqtarjuaq
Turaarvik Inns North, Rankin Inlet

Northwest Territories hotels include:
Arctic Char Inn, Ulukhaktok
Peel River Inn, Fort McPherson

Canadian Arctic Producers
Canadian Arctic Producers (CAP) is a marketing arm of the Arctic Co-ops that distributes artwork produced by Inuit, Dene and Métis people from the Arctic. They operate a warehouse in Toronto and ship art to private collectors and art galleries worldwide.

Subsidiary companies

Arctic Cable
Arctic Cable is a holding company formed to assist the 32 member co-ops in developing cable service offerings throughout the North. Eastern Arctic Television (EATV) is a subsidiary of Arctic Cable. EATV provides cable service to residents of Iqaluit.

Nunavut Sealink and Supply Incorporated

Nunavut Sealink and Supply Incorporated (NSSI) is a joint operation, with Desgagnes Transarctik, the Qikiqtaaluk Corporation, Sakku Investments Corporation, and the Kitikmeot Corporation, that provides a sealift service to Canada's Arctic. Established in 2000, it formed a partnership with Northern Transportation Company Limited (NTCL) and NorTran. In 2001 as the N3 Alliance it was the successful bidder for the Government of Nunavut's resupply, signing a two-year, $6 million contract.

Northern Images
Northern Images is an art gallery in Yellowknife. It sells Dene and Inuit art, including stone, ivory and bone carving produced from soapstone, walrus ivory, caribou antler, whalebone and muskox horn as well as limited edition prints and wallhangings, such as the Cape Dorset and Pangnirtung print collections. They also sell northern crafts and traditional handmade clothing such as mukluks, parkas and amautiit.

References

External links

Manitoba Cooperative Association

Cooperatives in Canada
Organizations established in 1972
Culture of the Arctic
Cooperative federations